Lichenin, also known as lichenan or moss starch, is a complex glucan occurring in certain species of lichens. It can be extracted from Cetraria islandica (Iceland moss). It has been studied since about 1957.

Structure 
Chemically, lichenin is a mixed-linkage glucan, consisting of repeating glucose units linked by β-1,3 and β-1,4 glycosidic bonds.

Uses 
It is an important carbohydrate for reindeers and northern flying squirrels, which eat the lichen Bryoria fremontii.

It can be extracted by digesting Iceland moss in a cold, weak solution of carbonate of soda for some time, and then boiling. By this process the lichenin is dissolved and on cooling separates as a colorless jelly. Iodine imparts no color to it.

Other uses of the name
In his 1960 novel Trouble with Lichen, John Wyndham gives the name Lichenin to a biochemical extract of lichen used to extend life expectancy beyond 300 years.

References 

Polysaccharides
Lichen products